Route 320, also the eastern portion of the Road to the Shore, starts at the Trans-Canada Highway (Route 1) at Gambo and runs north past Hare Bay, Dover, Indian Bay, Centreville-Wareham-Trinity, Greenspond through to New-Wes-Valley. Here, it connects with Route 330 which continues around the Cape Freels headland and exits back onto the TCH at Gander.

Route description

Route 320 begins in Gambo at an interchange with Route 1 (Trans-Canada Highway, Exit 24) and it heads northeast along the banks of Gambo River to pass through downtown before leaving Gambo and winding its way along Freshwater Bay for several kilometres. The highway now passes through Hare Bay, where it meets a local road leading to Dover, before passing through more inland and rural areas for several kilometres. Route 320 then heads through the towns of Centreville-Wareham-Trinity and Indian Bay to meet a local road leading to Greenspond. The highway now passes through more rural terrain before having two intersections with local road that loops through New-Wes-Valley, with the latter of the two being where Route 320 transitions to Route 330 (Road to the Shore/Gander Bay Road).

Major intersections

See also

List of Newfoundland and Labrador highways

References

320